The 2017 FIBA U18 European Championship Division B was the 13th edition of the Division B of the FIBA U18 European basketball championship. It was played in Tallinn, Estonia, from 28 July to 6 August 2017. 24 teams participated in the competition. Croatia men's national under-18 basketball team won the tournament.

Participating teams 

  (Winners, 2016 FIBA U18 European Championship Division C)

  (14th place, 2016 FIBA U18 European Championship Division A)

  (15th place, 2016 FIBA U18 European Championship Division A)

  (16th place, 2016 FIBA U18 European Championship Division A)

First round

Group A

Group B

Group C

Group D

Playoffs

17th–24th place playoffs

9th–16th place playoffs

Championship playoffs

Final standings

Awards 

All-Tournament Team

 Jaydon Kayne Henry McCalla
 Amit Ebo
 Ivan Alipiev
 Luka Šamanić
 Matthias Tass

References

External links
FIBA official website

FIBA U18 European Championship Division B
2017–18 in European basketball
2017–18 in Estonian basketball
International youth basketball competitions hosted by Estonia
Sports competitions in Tallinn
July 2017 sports events in Europe
August 2017 sports events in Europe